The Hull Open was annual men's and women's grass court tennis tournament founded as the Hull Westbourne Avenue Open Tournament in 1884. From 1905 to 1914 the tournament was co-branded as the East Yorkshire Championships. The tournament was organised by the Hull Lawn Tennis Club, Kingston-Upon-Hull, East Riding of Yorkshire, England. The tournament ran until 1956.

History
In 1884 the Hull Westbourne Avenue Open Tournament was organised by the Hull Lawn Tennis Club (f.1880), and played at the Westbourne Avenue Grounds. In 1891 that tournament was renamed as the Hull Open Tournament a grass court tennis event. In 1905 the tournament was co-branded as the East Yorkshire Championships, a county level event that lasted until 1914. Following World War I the tournament resumed under the name of the Hull Open. Despite being discontinued because of World War II it resumed thereafter through till at least 1956.

The men's  event though consisting of mainly British Isles players, did attract international players, the women's event started to attract international players after the Second World War. Senior tour tennis ceased to be staged in Kingston-Upon-Hull until 2002 when an event for women was established called the Hull Indoor Tournament that ran until 2006.

Results

Mens Singles
 Incomplete Roll included

Women's singles
Incomplete Roll

References

Grass court tennis tournaments
Defunct tennis tournaments in the United Kingdom